= Bhingaloli =

Village in Maharashtra

- Village
- Interactive map of Bhingaloli
- Country: India
- State: Maharashtra

Bhingaloli is a small village in Ratnagiri district, Maharashtra state in Western India. The 2011 Census of India recorded a total of 2,193 residents in the village. Bhingaloli's geographical area is 357 hectares (880 acres).
